Takht (alternatively spelled Takhat) is the representative musical ensemble, the orchestra, of Middle Eastern music. In Egypt, Syria, Lebanon, Palestine, and Jordan, the ensemble consists of the oud, the qanun, the kamanjah (or now alternatively violin), the ney, the riq, and the darabukkah . The word takht means "bed", "seat", or "podium" in Persian.

The melody instruments may play heterophonically in octaves or perform solos. Instrumental forms include bashraf, sama'i, tahmilah, and dulab. The ensemble may be joined by a male or female vocalist and a group of four to six singers who provide the refrain sections. Vocal genres performed include dawr, muwashshah, layali, ma'luf, qasidah, and mawwal.

While the takht typically comprised between two and five musicians, a similar, but larger ensemble (numbering eight or more) is called a firqa in Arabic.

Sources

Types of musical groups
Arabic music
Egyptian music
Persian music